George Albert Milliken is emeritus professor of statistics at Kansas State University. He is a Fellow of the American Statistical Association and has published many papers in various statistical journals. Milliken is a co-author of the three volume Analysis of Messy Data series (Volume 1: Designed Experiments; Volume 2: Nonreplicated Experiments; Volume 3: Analysis of Covariance) and the co-author of the book SAS System for Mixed Models.

Milliken's books are widely referenced in the statistical research community. He has placed a significant emphasis of his professional research on the following areas:
 Nonlinear mixed models
 Linear and nonlinear models
 Design of experiments, appropriate experimental units
 Mixed models, repeated measures, non-replicated experiments
 Complex designs from designed experiments and observational studies

References

External links
 Milliken's KSU faculty web page
 Milliken's consulting firm

Year of birth missing (living people)
Living people
People from Manhattan, Kansas
Kansas State University alumni
Fellows of the American Statistical Association